Shohadaye Moghavemat Qarchak Futsal Club was an Iranian professional futsal club based in Qarchak.

Season-by-season 
The table below chronicles the achievements of the Club in various competitions.

Last updated: December 20, 2021

References 

Futsal clubs in Iran
Sport in Qarchak
Sport in Tehran Province
Futsal clubs established in 2014
2014 establishments in Iran